Greene County, North Carolina is in District F of the NC Highway Historical Marker Program, and has two markers as of July 2020. The marker program was created by the North Carolina General Assembly in 1935. Since that time over 1600 black and silver markers have been placed along numbered North Carolina highways throughout the state. Each one has a brief description of a fact relevant to state history, and is located near a place related to that fact. North Carolina's counties are divided into seventeen districts for the highway marker program. Each marker is assigned an identifier that begins with the letter of the district, followed by a number.

References 

Greene County, North Carolina
Historical markers in the United States
History of North Carolina by county
North Carolina-related lists